Rufunsa District is a district in Zambia, located in Lusaka Province. The district capital is Rufunsa. The district was established by President Michael Sata in 2012 by splitting Chongwe District. It is estimated to have a population of about 45,000.

Economy 
The main economic activity of the local people is subsistence farming. Rufunsa holds gold, copper, and other minerals, although mining is not well-developed.

Education 
Five decades after Zambia's independence, Rufunsa district has three secondary schools. Literacy levels are low. The Catholic Church has given hope  by building a nursing school.

Geography 
Rufunsa is on the Great East Road, approximately 150 km east of the capital, Lusaka.

Demographics 
The indigenous people there are the remnants of the Soli people. They had to relinquish much of Lusaka land to the central government.

Governance 
Three chiefs live in this district; Chief Bunda Bumba, Chieftainess Mpanshya, and Chieftainess Shikabeta.

Before 1997, Rufunsa District along with Chongwe District and Kafue District, were known as "Lusaka Rural".

References 

Districts of Lusaka Province